Laparwah is a 1981 Hindi-language Indian action film directed by Ravikant Nagaich, starring Mithun Chakraborty, Ranjeeta Kaur, Prema Narayan and Shakti Kapoor in the leading roles.

Cast 

Mithun Chakraborty
Ranjeeta Kaur
Prema Narayan
Iftekhar
Shakti Kapoor
Shubha Khote
Satyendra Kapoor
Purnima
Tej Sapru
Asit Sen
Chandrashekhar
Birbal
Prem Bedi
Bhushan Jeevan
Sohail Khan
Manmauji
Ram Mohan
Ram P. Sethi
Sunder
Raj Tilak

Soundtrack 
The music of this movie was composed by Bappi Lahiri, with lyrics written by Ramesh Pant. The music was released by the Saregama label.

"Paisa Jis Ke Paas Hai, Duniya Uski Das Hai" – Jatin Pandit
"Koi Bhi Dil Me Na Aaya Tha, Najro Se Sabki Bachya Tha" – Chandrani Mukherjee, Kishore Kumar
"Ghar Ki Tijori Me" – Jatin Pandit, Manna Dey
"Mehfil Me Aakar Saaqi Banu Ya Mehboobat" – Jatin Pandit, Usha Mangeshkar
"Tumko Maine Sapno Me To Dekha Tha" – Jatin Pandit

References

External links 
 

1981 Western (genre) films
1981 films
1980s Hindi-language films
Indian Western (genre) films
Films scored by Bappi Lahiri
Films directed by Ravikant Nagaich